USS Camel may refer to the following ships of the United States Navy:

 , was an armed sloop, purchased in April 1813 and outfitted at Philadelphia Navy Yard.
 , was a tanker launched 31 October 1943 as William H. Carruth by the California Shipbuilding Corporation.

United States Navy ship names